Jonathan Trigell is a British author. His first novel, Boy A, won the John Llewellyn Rhys Prize 2004, the Waverton Good Read Award and the inaugural World Book Day Prize in 2008.

Jonathan completed an MA in creative writing at Manchester University, where he also studied English as an undergraduate. He spent many winters in the Alps working in the Ski Tourism Industry and now lives in Chamonix, France.

Boy A is the story of a child criminal released into society as an adult. It has obvious and presumably deliberate parallels to the fates of the murderers of James Bulger, although the crime itself differs significantly.

Highly acclaimed critically, Boy A was described by Sarah Waters, Chair of the Judges for the John Llewellyn Rhys Prize, as "a compelling narrative, a beautifully structured piece of writing, and a thought-provoking novel of ideas. It's a wonderful debut."

Trigell's follow up Cham, familiar name of Chamonix, also acquired by Serpent's Tail publishing house, was published in October 2007 and shortlisted for the Boardman Tasker Prize.

Jonathan's third work Genus - about a dystopian divided Britain - was published in July 2011. It contains chapters describing rioting in London eerily similar to the disturbances that broke out only weeks after publication. Genus was optioned for film by Matador Pictures, with Mike Carey (writer) attached to write the script.

Trigell's fourth novel was published in 2015 and titled The Tongues of Men or Angels. In an interview the author described it as "A Biblical Era Road Movie".

External links
Jonathan Trigell's official website
An interview with Jonathan Trigell
Jonathan Trigell is interviewed for Arts Award Voice

References

Living people
English writers
Alumni of the University of Manchester
British republicans
John Llewellyn Rhys Prize winners
English male writers
British social commentators
Year of birth missing (living people)